The 21st Dáil was elected at the 1977 general election on 16 June 1977 and met on 5 July 1977. The members of Dáil Éireann, the house of representatives of the Oireachtas (legislature) of Ireland, are known as TDs. The 21st Dáil saw a change of Taoiseach from Jack Lynch to Charles Haughey. On 21 May 1981, President Patrick Hillery dissolved the Dáil on the request of Taoiseach Charles Haughey. The 21st Dáil lasted  days.

Composition of the 21st Dáil

In July 1977, Fianna Fáil, denoted with a bullet, formed the 15th Government of Ireland, a majority government, led by Jack Lynch as Taoiseach. In December 1979, Charles Haughey succeeded as Fianna Fáil leader and Taoiseach, forming the 16th Government of Ireland.

Graphical representation
This is a graphical comparison of party strengths in the 21st Dáil from July 1977. This was not the official seating plan.

Ceann Comhairle
On the meeting of the Dáil, Joseph Brennan (FF) was proposed by Jack Lynch (FF) and seconded by George Colley (FF) for the position of Ceann Comhairle. Seán Treacy (Lab) was proposed by Garret FitzGerald (FG) and seconded by Joseph Bermingham (Lab) for the position. Brennan was elected by a vote of 84 to 60.

Brennan died on 13 July 1980. On 15 October 1980, Pádraig Faulkner (FF) was appointed Ceann Comhairle on a temporary basis. On 16 October 1980, Faulkner was proposed by Jack Lynch for the position on a permanent basis, and was elected without a vote.

TDs by constituency
The list of the 148 TDs elected is given in alphabetical order by Dáil constituency.

Changes

On 11 February 1981, a motion to move the writ for the vacancy in Tipperary North was rejected on a vote of 40 to 66.

See also
Members of the 14th Seanad

References

External links
Houses of the Oireachtas: Debates: 21st Dáil

 
21st Dáil
21